Govind Gaude is an Indian politician. Gaude is a member of the Goa Legislative Assembly from the Priol constituency in North Goa district as Independent member. Formerly, he was associated with Indian National Congress and fought 2007 Assembly elections from Marcaim constituency. Currently, he is the Minister of Art and Culture, Civil Supplies and Price Control and Tribal Welfare in Second Pramod Sawant ministry.

References 

People from North Goa district
Independent politicians in India
Indian National Congress politicians from Goa
Living people
Goa MLAs 2017–2022
Goa politicians
Bharatiya Janata Party politicians from Goa
1971 births
Goa MLAs 2022–2027